California Proposition 16 may refer to:

1922 California Proposition 16
2010 California Proposition 16
2020 California Proposition 16